The 2021 Houston Dynamo FC season was the 16th season of the team's existence since joining Major League Soccer (MLS) prior to the 2006 season. It was the team's second season under head coach Tab Ramos and seventh season under general manager Matt Jordan.  On August 30, with the team on a 15-game winless streak, Jordan was fired.  On November 1, with one game left in the season, Pat Onstad was hired as the new GM.

The Dynamo finished the season last in the Western Conference for the second consecutive season, failing to qualify for the playoffs for the 7th time in 8 seasons.

On the front office end, it was Gabriel Brener's sixth season as majority owner and John Walker's third season as President of Business Operations.  On June 22, Ted Segal became majority owner after purchasing a controlling stake of the Dynamo and Dash for a reported $400 million. Former majority owner Brener kept a minority stake in the team, with James Harden, Oscar De La Hoya, and Ben Guill keeping their minority stakes.  Minority owner Jake Silverstein sold his part of the team.

In October, BBVA Stadium was rebranded as PNC Stadium following PNC Financial Services' acquisition of BBVA USA.

Current squad 

Appearances and goals are totals for MLS regular season only.

Player movement

In 
Per Major League Soccer and club policies terms of the deals do not get disclosed.

Out

Loans in

Loans out

MLS SuperDraft

Coaching staff

Non-competitive

Preseason

Competitions

Major League Soccer

Standings

Western Conference

Overall

Results summary

Results by round

Match results

U.S. Open Cup 
On July 20, U.S. Soccer announced that the Open Cup would be cancelled for 2021 and would resume in 2022.

Season statistics 
{| class="wikitable sortable" style="text-align:center;"
|+
! rowspan="2" |No.
! rowspan="2" |Pos
! rowspan="2" |Nat
! rowspan="2" |Player
! colspan="5" |Total
! colspan="5" |MLS
|-
!
!
!
!style="width:30px;"|
!style="width:30px;"|
!
!
!
!style="width:30px;"|
!style="width:30px;"|
|-
|1||GK||||align=left|Marko Marić||22||0||0||0||0||22||0||0||0||0
|-
|2||DF||||align=left|Alejandro Fuenmayor||3||0||0||0||0||3||0||0||0||0
|-
|3||DF||||align=left|Adam Lundqvist||25||0||2||1||0||25||0||2||1||0
|-
|4||DF||||align=left|Zarek Valentin||29||0||1||5||0||29||0||1||5||0
|-
|5||DF||||align=left|Tim Parker||34||0||0||3||0||34||0||0||3||0
|-
|7||FW||||align=left|Mateo Bajamich||9||0||1||1||0||9||0||1||1||0
|-
|8||MF||||align=left|Memo Rodríguez||31||2||2||3||0||31||2||2||3||0
|-
|9||FW||||align=left|Christian Ramirez||6||1||0||0||0||6||1||0||0||0
|-
|10||MF||||align=left|Fafà Picault||31||11||5||9||0||31||11||5||9||0
|-
|11||FW||||align=left|Ariel Lassiter||19||0||0||1||0||19||0||0||1||0
|-
|12||FW||||align=left|Corey Baird||7||0||0||0||0||7||0||0||0||0
|-
|13||DF||||align=left|Ethan Bartlow||0||0||0||0||0||0||0||0||0||0
|-
|14||MF||||align=left|Joe Corona||30||0||2||5||0||30||0||2||5||0
|-
|14||MF||||align=left|Marcelo Palomino||0||0||0||0||0||0||0||0||0||0
|-
|15||DF||||align=left|Maynor Figueroa||13||0||2||4||0||13||0||2||4||0
|-
|16||DF||||align=left|José Bizama||1||0||0||0||0||1||0||0||0||0
|-
|17||MF||||align=left|Nico Lemoine||1||0||0||0||0||1||0||0||0||0
|-
|18||DF||||align=left|Teenage Hadebe||17||0||1||3||0||17||0||1||3||0
|-
|19||FW||||align=left|Tyler Pasher||19||4||3||0||0||19||4||3||0||0
|-
|20||MF||||align=left|Adalberto Carrasquilla||10||1||0||2||0||10||1||0||2||0
|-
|21||MF||||align=left|Derrick Jones||20||0||1||4||0||20||0||1||4||0
|-
|22||MF||||align=left|Matías Vera||30||3||1||9||0||31||3||1||0||0
|-
|23||FW||||align=left|Darwin Quintero||20||3||2||2||0||20||3||2||2||0
|-
|24||MF||||align=left|Darwin Cerén||25||0||2||4||1||25||0||2||4||1
|-
|25||MF||||align=left|Griffin Dorsey||20||2||3||2||0||20||2||3||2||0
|-
|26||GK||||align=left|Michael Nelson||11||0||0||0||0||11||0||0||0||0
|-
|27||MF||||align=left|Boniek García||16||0||0||4||0||16||0||0||4||0
|-
|28||DF||||align=left|Erik McCue||0||0||0||0||0||0||0||0||0||0
|-
|29||DF||||align=left|Sam Junqua||22||0||1||4||0||22||0||1||4||0
|-
|30||MF||||align=left|Ian Hoffmann||6||0||0||1||0||6||0||0||1||0
|-
|31||GK||||align=left|Kyle Morton||1||0||0||0||0||1||0||0||0||0
|-
|32||MF||||align=left|Juan Castilla||2||0||0||0||0||2||0||0||0||0
|-
|33||FW||||align=left|Danny Ríos||0||0||0||0||0||0||0||0||0||0
|-
|37||FW||||align=left|Maximiliano Urruti||30||7||4||4||0||30||7||4||4||0

Honors and awards

MLS Team of the Week

MLS Goal of the Week

Dynamo team awards

References 

2021
Houston Dynamo FC
Houston Dynamo FC
Houston Dynamo FC